Birkett Lee Pribble (August 25, 1897 – December 24, 1987) was an American college football player. He was a guard for the Kentucky Wildcats, selected All-Southern in 1922. The 1922 team beat Alabama.

References

External links
 

1897 births
1987 deaths
American football guards
Kentucky Wildcats football players
All-Southern college football players
People from Pendleton County, Kentucky
Players of American football from Kentucky